Darreh Jafti Dasht (also Romanized as Darreh Jaftī Dasht) is a village in Vahdat Rural District, Mugarmun District, Landeh County, Kohgiluyeh and Boyer-Ahmad Province, Iran. At the 2006 census, its population was 55, in 10 families.

References 

Populated places in Landeh County